Menemerus modestus is a jumping spider species in the genus Menemerus that lives in Tunisia. It is related to Menemerus guttatus. It was first described by Wanda Wesołowska in 1999. The species name derives from the Latin for quiet, .

References

Spiders described in 1999
Fauna of Tunisia
Salticidae
Spiders of Africa
Taxa named by Wanda Wesołowska